WPCV (97.5 MHz) is a commercial FM radio station, licensed to Winter Haven and serving Central Florida.  It has a country music radio format and is owned and operated by Hall Communications.  The radio studios and offices are in Lakeland.

While the station predominantly covers Polk County, WPCV also serves listeners in Greater Orlando and parts of the Tampa Bay area, with its transmitter on Cypress Parkway in Haines City. It has an effective radiated power (ERP) of 100,000 watts, the maximum for non-grandfathered FM stations. That makes WPCV one of few radio stations in Central Florida to reach both Atlantic and Gulf coasts.

History
On , the station signed on the air.  Its first call sign was WINT-FM.  In 1967, the station became WXKL, with a beautiful music format.  It played quarter hour sweeps of mostly instrumental cover versions of popular songs, with some Hollywood and Broadway show tunes.  In 1972, the call letters switched to WHFL.

In 1975, the station flipped to country music.  To go along with the new format, it switched to its current call sign, WPCV, which stands for Polk County's Voice.

References

External links
Official website

Country radio stations in the United States
PCV
Radio stations established in 1963
1963 establishments in Florida